Brad Barnes (born 11 February 1998) is a Jamaican cricketer. He made his List A debut for West Indies B in the 2018–19 Regional Super50 tournament on 15 October 2018. Prior to his List A debut, he was named in the West Indies' squad for the 2018 Under-19 Cricket World Cup.

References

External links
 

1998 births
Living people
Jamaican cricketers
West Indies B cricketers
Place of birth missing (living people)